Jimmy Dzingai (born 21 November 1990) is a Zimbabwean footballer who plays as a defender for Bangladesh Premier League club Muktijoddha Sangsad KC and the Zimbabwe national team.

References

External links

1990 births
Living people
CAPS United players
Zimbabwe Premier Soccer League players
Zimbabwean footballers
Zimbabwe international footballers
Association football defenders
2019 Africa Cup of Nations players
Yadah Stars F.C. players
Triangle United F.C. players
Muktijoddha Sangsad KC players